Duwee Falls is a steep tiered waterfall on Munson Creek, a tributary of the Klamath River, that plunges into a gaping canyon within the Crater Lake National Park in the U.S. state of Oregon.

References

Waterfalls of Klamath County, Oregon
Crater Lake National Park
Plunge waterfalls